The  1957–58 Panhellenic Championship was the 22nd season of the highest football league of Greece. Olympiacos won their 14th championship (5 consecutive) after an interesting race with AEK Athens and Panathinaikos.

Compared to the previous season, the teams that participated in the final phase of the championship increased by 2 (12 out of 10) and resulted as follows:
Athenian Championship: The first 4 teams of the ranking.
Piraeus' Championship: The first 3 teams of the ranking.
Macedonian Championship: The first 3 teams of the ranking.
Regional Championships: The 2 winners (Northern and Southern Group).
The qualifying round matches took place from 22 September 1957 to 15 January 1958, while the final phase took place from 19 January to 23 July 1958. The point system was: Win: 3 points - Draw: 2 points - Loss: 1 point.

Qualification round

Athens Football Clubs Association

Piraeus Football Clubs Association

Macedonia Football Clubs Association

Regional Championship

Southern Group

Northern Group

Final round

League table

Results

Top scorers

External links
Rsssf, 1957-58 championship
Andreas Mpomis «Γκολ 2000 Ένας αιώνας ποδόσφαιρο», Pelekanos Publications, Athens 1999, p. 260-264.
G. Kousounelos «Η ιστορία του ελληνικού ποδοσφαίρου 1896-1985», vol 2, Nikitopoulos Publications, Athens 1985, p. 225-235.
Christos Nerantzis «Παγκόσμιο ποδόσφαιρο», vol 2, Nastos Publications, Thessaloniki 1975, p. 442, 443.

Panhellenic Championship seasons
1957–58 in Greek football
Greek